Lamoria jordanis is a species of snout moth. It is found in Spain, Israel and the Palestinian Territories.

The wingspan is about 33 mm.

References

Moths described in 1901
Tirathabini